"Pieces of a Dream" is the first single from the Japanese R&B (J-urban) band Chemistry.

Overview
This was the first single from the duo that had won the Asayan held in Japan. Since the band won a contest similar to the American Idol show, the single was expected to be a success. Although the single debuted at #2 on the Oricon charts, it finally reached #1 after 6 weeks.  For 15 weeks, it stayed in the top 10.  Once it fell from the number one spot, it charted for another twenty-two weeks. "Pieces of a Dream" was the third-highest ranking single of 2001, selling over one million copies.

In 2016, the song was featured in the Anime, ReLIFE for episode 11 ending theme.

Track list
 "Pieces of a Dream"
 "Two"
 "Pieces of a Dream (Old School Mix)"
 "Pieces of a Dream (Less Vocal)"

Charts
Oricon Sales Chart (Japan)

2001 singles
Oricon Weekly number-one singles
Chemistry (band) songs
2001 songs
Defstar Records singles